Zargaran may refer to:

Zərgəran, a village in Azerbaijan
Zargaran (Afghanistan), a village in Nangarhar Province, Afghanistan
Zargaran, Ghazni, Afghanistan
Zargaran, Marvdasht, Fars Province, Iran
Zargaran, Lorestan, Iran
Zargaran-e Olya, Iran
Zargaran-e Sofla, Iran